Lexicon is a computer-assisted role-playing game invented by Neel Krishnaswami and popularised by the indie role-playing game community. As originally proposed, it is played online using wiki software. Players assume the role of scholars who write the history and background of a particular fictitious time, setting, or incident. As the game goes on, the players collaboratively create an elaborately interwoven account.

Each game is a series of 26 turns, keyed to the letters of the alphabet from A to Z. On the first turn, each player must write an Encyclopedia-style entry beginning with the letter A, citing and linking to two entries that are not yet written. These are called "undefined" entries. Undefined entries must begin with a letter later in the alphabet.

The 25 subsequent turns proceed consecutively through the letters of the alphabet, one letter per turn. In a turn, each player writes one entry that begins with the turn's specified letter. If one or more undefined entries are available that begin with the letter, a player must choose and write an undefined entry before any new entries can be created under that letter. A new entry must create and link to two undefined entries, and must also link to an entry written on a previous turn. Near the endgame, when sufficient undefined entries exist to occupy all players for the remainder of the game, no new undefined entries may be created.

Many variants exist, such as covering two or three letters per turn, or starting each player on a different letter. Some games permit other players to post comments or expansions of earlier entries. The optional "Rule of X" treats X (or any other appropriate letter) as a wild card; entries for the X turn may begin with any letter. "Telephone pad" is a shorter variant with 8 turns (corresponding to the letters on a telephone keypad) instead of 26 turns (one per letter of the alphabet).

See also 
 Epic Legends Of The Hierarchs: The Elemenstor Saga

References

External links 
 Lexicon: An RPG — the original idea for Lexicon.
 Lexicon Rules and Variants — A collection and clarification of the original rules, combined with a compilation of almost every variant.
 An (old) list of Lexicon games
 The New Metamorphoses: A Lexicon

Collaborative fiction
Indie role-playing games
Universal role-playing games
Role-playing games introduced in 2003